The 41st Gawad Urian Awards or Ika-41 na Gawad Urian was held on June 14, 2018 at ABS-CBN Vertis Tent. They honored the best Filipino films for the year 2017. It aired live at Cinema One channel.

Nominations were announced on May 22. Respeto received the most nominations with twelve.

Balangiga: Howling Wilderness won the Best Film while Respeto won the most awards with four. The Natatanging Gawad Urian was awarded to jazz pianist and musical scorer Winston Raval.

Winners and nominees

Multiple nominations and awards

References

External links
 Official Website of the Manunuri ng Pelikulang Pilipino

Gawad Urian Awards
2017 film awards
2018 in Philippine cinema